First Christian Church (also known as Maasdam's Christian Church) is a historic church at 824 Franklin Street in Pella, Iowa.

It is a small, one-story brick church, was built between 1858 and 1862.  As of 1869, it was named the Soul Sleepers Church.  During the 1880s it held the Pella Y.M.C.A.  As of 2022 it is the site of an independent bookstore, Pella Books.

Its significance includes that, according to its NRHP nomination:"...it calls attention to religion and social history among the Pella Dutch. During the 19th century, attempts to unite the various stripes of Dutch Protestantism in the United States, evolving since the 17th century, failed and resulted in schism and the formation of two separate denominations. This national schism exacerbated a religious volatility already simmering in Pella. First Christian Church calls attention to this strife within the otherwise homogeneous Dutch-American community, as religion became the focus of local controversy during the 1850s and 1860s. These controversies centered on Domine Henry P. Scholte, the pastor of the original flock of Dutch Reformed settlers in Pella, and divergent forms of worship then emerging among some of the settlers. Elder Jacob Maasdam, a charismatic layman, led one of these latter groups. His adherents built the First Christian Church, where they worshipped until circa 1869, splitting Scholte's flock, which built another church.

It was added to the National Register of Historic Places in 2007.

References

Reformed churches in Iowa
Churches on the National Register of Historic Places in Iowa
Gothic Revival church buildings in Iowa
Churches completed in 1860
National Register of Historic Places in Marion County, Iowa
Churches in Marion County, Iowa
Dutch-American culture in Iowa